La Musica Lirica is a five-week training program structured for performance artists looking to gain hands-on training and experience, immersed in its environment, as a way to help bridge the gap between college and career.  Founded in 1999, this music festival now produces three to four operas each season with over seventy performers. Soprano Brygida Bziukiewicz-Kulig is the General and Artistic Director of La Musica Lirica, Mezzo-Soprano Julie Maurer is the Director of Artistic Development, and Maestro Joseph Rescigno is the Artistic Advisor.	

The program is geared toward advanced singers that are ready to begin or have already started a professional career as an opera singer. Rehearsals are run on a professional level. Each participant receives up to 20 hours of Italian per week, two half-hour weekly coachings with Rossini Opera Festival Coaches, two forty-five-minute voice lessons per week, two to four recitative classes with maestri and weekly masterclasses with resident faculty. The operas are all double cast. Those participants cast in roles perform two of the four fully stage performances with a professional orchestra. 

Recent conductors, stage directors and vocal faculty include Alberto Zedda, Joseph Rescigno, Candace Evans, Francois Loup, Dejan Miladinovic, Ubaldo Fabbri, Julia Faulkner, Mary Anne Scott, Karen Peeler, John DeHaan, Kathy Kraulik, Brooks Hafey, Robert Breault, Emily Williams, Jeffrey Price and Dennis Jesse.

External links
lamusicalirica.com

Classical music festivals in Italy